Defending champion Ivan Lendl successfully defended his title, defeating Mats Wilander in the final 7–5, 6–2, 3–6, 7–6(7–3) to win the men's singles tennis title at the 1987 French Open.

Seeds
The seeded players are listed below. Ivan Lendl is the champion; others show the round in which they were eliminated.

  Ivan Lendl (champion)
  Boris Becker (semifinals)
  Stefan Edberg (second round)
  Mats Wilander (finalist)
  Miloslav Mečíř (semifinals)
  Yannick Noah (quarterfinals)
  John McEnroe (first round)
  Jimmy Connors (quarterfinals)
  Henri Leconte (first round)
  Andrés Gómez (quarterfinals)
  Kent Carlsson (fourth round)
  Pat Cash (first round)
  Mikael Pernfors (first round)
  Martín Jaite (fourth round)
  Brad Gilbert (second round)
  Johan Kriek (first round)

Draw

Finals

Section 1

Section 2

Section 3

Section 4

Section 5

Section 6

Section 7

Section 8

External links
 Association of Tennis Professionals (ATP) – 1987 French Open Men's Singles draw
1987 French Open – Men's draws and results at the International Tennis Federation

Men's Singles
French Open by year – Men's singles
1987 Grand Prix (tennis)